Luiz Tiago Linhares Calixto (born March 19, 1988 in Curitiba, Brazil) is a Brazilian footballer currently playing for San Antonio Scorpions in the North American Soccer League.

Career
Tiago spent his early career in Brazil, playing for Coritiba, Atlético Paranaense, Londrina and Cascavel CR before heading to the United States to sign for North American Soccer League club San Antonio Scorpions on January 9, 2012.

References

External links
 NASL profile

1988 births
Living people
Brazilian footballers
Brazilian expatriate footballers
Club Athletico Paranaense players
Londrina Esporte Clube players
San Antonio Scorpions players
Expatriate soccer players in the United States
North American Soccer League players
Association football midfielders
Footballers from Curitiba